Bernard Alexandre George Edmond de Pourtalès (5 June 1870 – 5 July 1935) was a Swiss infantry captain and sailor who competed in the 1900 Summer Olympics.

In 1900 he was a member of the Swiss boat Lérina, which won the gold medal in the first race and silver medal in the second race of the 1 to 2 ton class. He also participated in the open class, but did not finish. His uncle Hermann and uncle's wife Hélène were also crew members.

He was born in Bellevue, Switzerland, and died in Casablanca, French Morocco.

Further reading

References

External links

1870 births
1935 deaths
Swiss male sailors (sport)
Sailors at the 1900 Summer Olympics – 1 to 2 ton
Olympic sailors of Switzerland
Olympic gold medalists for Switzerland
Olympic silver medalists for Switzerland
Medalists at the 1900 Summer Olympics
Pourtalès family
Olympic medalists in sailing
Sportspeople from the canton of Geneva
Sailors at the 1900 Summer Olympics – Open class